Lexi Berg (born Alexandra Berglöf) is a Swedish-American singer and songwriter based in London, United Kingdom. She first became known for her self-released debut single "What If", which became part of the soundtrack for the critically acclaimed 2020 Netflix drama Pieces of a Woman starring Vanessa Kirby. She has since signed with East West Records, a label under Warner Music UK, and released the EP "Empire of One" in September 2021.

Biography
Berglöf was born in Stockholm, Sweden, the eldest child of a Swedish father and a British mother. Her father is an economics professor while her mother is a writer. She also has a younger sister who is a playwright. Berglöf learned how to play the piano from her mother at the age of five while they lived in a houseboat in Stockholm. She later studied classical piano with the help of a Romanian tutor and eventually trained at Sweden's Royal School of Music.

After graduating from college and a brief foray in dance music writing and giving singing lessons, Berglöf began writing music and recording demos. She sent them to Faris Badwan, lead vocalist of the English rock band The Horrors, who liked her songs and offered to be her music producer. Their collaboration produced the songs "What If", "Take Off Your Disguise", and "Where Will We Be". Berglöf released and promoted all three songs independently and pitched it over 30 different blogs and various music streaming services before it was picked up by Spotify and Apple Music. "What If" was included in the soundtrack for the 2020 Netflix film Pieces of a Woman starring Vanessa Kirby, which catapulted Berglöf into the limelight. In December 2019, she signed record deal with East West Records, a music label under Warner Music UK. Since signing with the label, she has collaborated with several musicians and producers like Jonathan Quarmby, Jimmy Hogarth, Jim Eliot, Benjamin Francis Leftwich, Sacha Skarbek, and Wayne Hector to write and produce songs for her EP Empire of One, which was released on 24 September 2021. On 15 October 2022, Berg sang the American national anthem before the WBO female middleweight championship fight between American boxer Claressa Shields and British boxer Savannah Marshall at The O2 Arena in London.

Berglöf cites ABBA, Fleetwood Mac, Stevie Nicks, Florence Welch, Adele, The Beatles and Celine Dion as her inspirations.

Discography 
Extended Plays
 Empire of One (2021)

Singles
 "Empire of One" (Released on 24 September 2021)
 "Lonely World" (Released on 20 August 2021)
 "Midnight Sun" (Released on 23 July 2021)
 "Helpless to Help You" (Released on 11 June 2021)
 "Into the Sea" (Released on 14 May 2021)
 "Where Will We Be" (Released on 19 June 2020)
 "Take Off Your Disguise" (Released on 16 October 2019)
 "What If" (Released on 4 September 2019)

References

External links
 

Living people
American people of Swedish descent
Swedish pop singers
Swedish songwriters
English-language singers from Sweden
21st-century Swedish women singers
Year of birth missing (living people)